My Marriage is a 1936 American drama film directed by George Archainbaud and written by Frances Hyland. The film stars Claire Trevor, Kent Taylor, Pauline Frederick, Paul Kelly, Helen Wood and Thomas Beck. The film was released on January 31, 1936, by 20th Century Fox.

Plot

Cast 
Claire Trevor as Carol Barton
Kent Taylor as John DeWitt Tyler III
Pauline Frederick as Mrs. DeWitt Tyler II 
Paul Kelly as Barney Dolan
Helen Wood as Elizabeth Tyler
Thomas Beck as Roger Tyler
Beryl Mercer as Mrs. Dolan
Henry Kolker as Major Vaile
Colin Tapley as Sir Philip Burleigh
Noel Madison as Marty Harris
Ralf Harolde as Jones
Charles Richman as H.J. Barton
Frank Dawson as Saunders
Lynn Bari as Pat
Barbara Blane as Doris
Paul McVey as Detective

References

External links 
 

1936 films
American drama films
1936 drama films
20th Century Fox films
Films directed by George Archainbaud
American black-and-white films
Films set in Long Island
1930s English-language films
1930s American films